Improved-definition television (IDTV) or enhanced-quality television transmitters and receivers exceed the performance requirements of the NTSC standard, while remaining within the general parameters of NTSC emissions standards. 

IDTV improvements may be made at the television transmitter or receiver. Improvements include enhancements in encoding, digital filtering, scan interpolation, interlaced line scanning, and ghost cancellation. 

IDTV improvements must allow the TV signal to be transmitted and received in the standard 4:3 aspect ratio.

See also
 Comb filter
 Federal Standard 1037C
 Video scaler

References

Television technology